Scirpophaga serenus is a moth in the family Crambidae. It was described by Edward Meyrick in 1935. It is found in Angola and the Democratic Republic of the Congo (Katanga, West Kasai).

References

Moths described in 1935
Schoenobiinae
Moths of Africa